Presidential elections were held in Syria on 10 February 1999. There was only one candidate, incumbent president Hafez al-Assad, with voters asked to approve or reject his candidacy. A reported 100% of voters voted in favour, with a turnout of 98%. Assad was re-elected for another seven-year term. However, he died in June 2000, resulting in an early presidential election that year.

Results

References

Syria
President
Presidential elections in Syria
Single-candidate elections